Deutsche Telekom AG v Commission (2010) C-280/08 is a European competition law case relevant for UK enterprise law, concerning telecommunications.

Facts 
Deutsche Telekom AG claimed the Commission had wrongly found it abused its dominant position under TFEU article 102, in charging higher prices to access its local loop: the physical circuit connecting the network termination point at a subscriber's premises to the main distribution frame or equivalent facility in the fixed public telephone network. Under German law and the Telecommunications Directives, DT was required to give access to competitors. The Commission said it was charging competitors more than its own retail end-user customers. The margin between the wholesale access price and its retail prices was not enough to cover downstream costs. DT's prices were approved by the German telecomms regulator (RegTP). The Commission said once a margin squeeze was shown, it was unnecessary to assess the effects on competition. This was already an abuse. Deutsche Telekom argued there could be no abuse because its prices were approved by the Regulator.

The General Court upheld the Commission's decision. It said the abuse was an unfair ‘spread’ between wholesale and retail prices. Margin squeezing was a separate abuse from predatory pricing.

Judgment
The CJEU upheld the General Court.

See also

United Kingdom enterprise law
EU law

Notes

United Kingdom enterprise case law